Aminosteroids are a group of steroids with a similar structure based on an amino-substituted steroid nucleus. They are neuromuscular blocking agents, acting as competitive antagonists of the nicotinic acetylcholine receptor (nAChR), and block the signaling of acetylcholine in the nervous system. These drugs include candocuronium iodide (chandonium iodide), dacuronium bromide, dihydrochandonium, dipyrandium, malouetine, pancuronium bromide, pipecuronium bromide, rapacuronium bromide, rocuronium bromide, stercuronium iodide, and vecuronium bromide.

See also
 Benzylisoquinolines, such as atracurium and tubocurarine, the other major group of neuromuscular blocking agents

References

Muscle relaxants
Nicotinic antagonists
Quaternary ammonium compounds
Steroids